Moskal is an ethnic slur (formerly neutral term) that means "Russian", literally "Muscovite", in Ukrainian, Romanian, Polish and Belarusian.

Moskal may also refer to:

Moskal (surname)

See also
 Moskal-Charivnyk, a 1995 Ukrainian film